Xylodromus concinnus is a species of rove beetle in the Omaliinae subfamily, that can be found everywhere in Europe, the Near East, and Australia.

References

Omaliinae
Beetles described in 1802
Beetles of Australia
Beetles of Europe
Taxa named by Thomas Marsham